Acontia sexpunctata is a moth of the family Noctuidae first described by Johan Christian Fabricius in 1794. It is found in Sri Lanka and India.

Its host plant is Sida rhombifolia.

References

Moths of Asia
Moths described in 1794
sexpunctata